Events in the year 1879 in Norway.

Incumbents
Monarch: Oscar II

Events
The Kverneland Group was established by Ole Gabriel Kverneland.

Arts and literature
Henrik Ibsen (while living in Italy) publishes  A Doll's House

Births

January to June
26 January – Birger Braadland, politician (died 1966)
5 March – Rachel Grepp, journalist and politician (died 1961)
24 March – Leiv Heggstad, educator, linguist and translator (died 1954).
11 April – Øistein Schirmer, gymnast and Olympic gold medallist (died 1947)
29 April – Henrik Ameln, jurist and politician (died 1961)
23 May – Kjeld Stub Irgens, sea captain and collaborator minister (died 1963)
27 May – Per Reidarson, composer and music critic (died 1954)
28 May – Lilly Heber, literary critic and historian (died 1944)
30 May – Olaf Josef Johansen, politician.
27 June – Martin Tranmæl, socialist leader (died 1967)

July to September
9 July – Karen Platou, politician (died 1950)
5 August – Ole Hallesby, Lutheran neo-orthodox pietist (died 1961)
6 August – Kyrre Grepp, politician (died 1922)
6 September
 Knud Leonard Knudsen, gymnast and Olympic gold medallist (died 1954)
 Johan Nygaardsvold, politician and Prime Minister of Norway (died 1952)
14 September – Andreas Brecke, sailor and Olympic gold medallist (died 1952)
29 September – Nils Bertelsen, sailor and Olympic gold medallist (died 1958)
30 September – Johan Falkberget, author (died 1967)

October to December
1 October – Lauritz Sand, resistance fighter (died 1956)
5 October – Halfdan Cleve, composer (died 1951)
21 October – Torkell Vinje, politician (died 1955)
20 November – Martin Stenersen, sport shooter (died 1968)
27 November – Gil Andersen, motor racing driver in America (died 1935)
29 November – Nils Trædal, cleric, politician and Minister (died 1948)
6 December – Rudolf Gundersen, speed skater (died 1946)

Full date unknown
Anders Fjelstad, politician (died 1955)

Deaths
5 February – Halvor Schou, industrialist (born 1823)
8 April – Christian Cornelius Paus, lawyer, civil servant and politician (born 1800)
2 September – Johan Collett Falsen, jurist and politician (born 1817)

Full date unknown
Jan Henrik Nitter Hansen, businessman and politician (born 1801)
Henrik Krohn, poet, magazine editor and proponent for Nynorsk language (born 1826)

See also

References